Ali is a common unisex name. 

In Arabic, Ali is derived from the Arabic root ʕ-l-w, which literally means "high", "elevated" or "champion", and is used as both a given name and surname. Islamic traditional use of the name goes back to the Islamic leader Ali ibn Abi Talib, but the name is also present among some pre-Islamic Arabs (e.g. Banu Hanifa, and some rulers of Saba and Himyar).

Ali as a surname has become popular in domains under the influence of Islamic culture. This is especially so in the Caribbean where indentured labourers from South Asia were brought to replace African slave labour after the end of the Transatlantic slave trade, in countries such as Guyana and Trinidad and Tobago.

The name Ali is also used in various other cultures as a given name. Among English speakers it is used as a short form of male or female names starting with "Ali", such as Alice, Alison, Alisha, Alistair, Alexander, or Alexandra. In Old Norse, Áli and Åle are alternative forms of Onela. Ali is a Finnish male given name, derived from Aleksanteri.

Islam
 Al-Ali (The Sublimely Exalted), one of the 99 names of God in Islam
 Ali ibn Abi Talib (601–661), cousin and son-in-law of the Islamic prophet Muhammad, the fourth Caliph of Sunni Islam, and the first Imam in most schools of Shia Islam
 Ali ibn Husayn (Zayn al-Abidin), grandson of Ali ibn Abi Talib, fourth infallible Imam in Isma'ili and Twelver Shia Islam
 Ali ibn Musa (ar-Reza) ( – 818), eighth infallible Imam in Shia Islam
 Ali ibn Muhammad (al-Hadi), tenth infallible Imam in Shia Islam
 Ali ibn Sahl Rabban al-Tabari, Persian Muslim scholar, physician and psychologist
 Ali ibn al-Mu'tasim, 9th-century Abbasid prince and son of Al-Mu'tasim
 Ali al-Muktafi, Abbasīd caliph from 902 to 908
 Ali al-Ridha, descendant of Muhammad and the eighth Imam
 Ali ibn Husayn Zayn al-Abidin, Imam in Shiʻi Islam
 Husayn ibn Ali, Abu Abd Allah or Imam Husayn, a grandson of Muhammad
 Hasan ibn Ali, the firstborn son of Ali and Fatima and a grandson of Muhammad
 Ali ibn al-Athir, 12th- and 13th-century Islamic historian and geographer
 Ali Jaunpuri (1800–1873), Islamic scholar

Given male name

Arts and entertainment
Ali Akbar Navis, Indonesian author
Ali Gatie, Iraqi-Canadian singer-songwriter
Ali Hassan (born 1972), Indian television actor
Ali Kiba (born 1986), Tanzanian singer and songwriter 
Ali Özgentürk, Turkish film director
Ali Rehman Khan, Pakistani actor
Ali Saad (actor), Lebanese actor and voice actor
Ali Saleem, Pakistani television host
Ali Salem, Egyptian playwright
Ali Shahalom, British-Bangladeshi comedian
Ali Al-Zein, Lebanese actor and voice actor
Ali Campbell, British singer and member of UB40

Sports
Ali Adnan Kadhim (born 1993), Iraqi footballer
Ali Alaaeddine (born 1993), Lebanese footballer
Ali Alanç (born 1959), Turkish football manager
Ali Annabi, Tunisian fencer
Ali Asfand (born 2004), Pakistani cricketer
Ali Bacher, South African cricket batsman and administrator
Ali Daei (born 1969), Iranian footballer
Ali Daher (born 1996), Lebanese footballer
Ali Demić, Bosnian basketball player
Ali Eren Demirezen (born 1990), Turkish amateur boxer
Ali Fakih (born 1967), Lebanese footballer
Ali Farahat, Egyptian chess player
Ali Farokhmanesh (born 1988), American basketball player and coach
Ali Fayad (disambiguation), multiple people
Ali Gaye (born 1998), American football player
Ali Ferit Gören (1913-1987), Austrian-Turkish Olympic sprinter
Ali Güneş, Turkish footballer
Ali Kaya (athlete) (born Stanley Kiprotich Mukche in 1994), Kenyan-Turkish long-distance runner
Ali Kireş, Turkish footballer
Ali Marpet (born 1993), American football player in the NFL
Ali Marwi, Kuwaiti footballer
Ali Musse (born 1996), Somali footballer
Ali Noorzad, Afghan basketball player
Ali Ölmez, Turkish footballer
Ali Omari, Afghan footballer
Ali Öztürk (footballer born 1986), Turkish footballer
Ali Öztürk (footballer born 1987), Turkish footballer
Ali Sabeh (born 1994), Lebanese footballer
Ali Sami Yen, Turkish Association football entrepreneur
Ali Sánchez, Venezuelan professional baseball player
Ali Sarı (born 1986), Turkish taekwondo practitioner
Ali Tandoğan, Turkish footballer
Ali Topaloğlu (born 1998), Turkish track and field athlete with Down syndrome
Ali Turan, Turkish footballer
Ali Williams (born 1981), New Zealand rugby union player
Ali Nihat Yazıcı, Turkish chess official
Ali Efe Yeğin (born 1993), Turkish professional motorcycle racer

Others
Ali Aaltonen, Finnish Red Guard commander
Ali al-Abdallah, Syrian writer and human rights activist
Ali Akdemir, Turkish scientist
Ali Alatas, Indonesian diplomat
Ali Aldabbagh, Iraqi engineer and politician
Ali Abu Awwad, Palestinian pacifist
Ali Babacan, Turkish politician
Ali Mohammad Besharati (born 1945), Iranian politician 
Ali Bozer, Turkish politician
Ali Brownlee (1959–2016), English sportscaster
Ali Çetinkaya, Turkish Army officer
Ali al-Dandachi, Syrian scout leader
Ali Dizaei (born 1962), Anglo-Iranian police officer and criminal
Ali Džabič (1853–1918), Bosnian mufti
Ali Erdemir, Turkish scientist
Ali Fadel, Iraqi politician
Ali Hassan al-Majid (1941–2010), Iraqi politician and mass murderer
Ali Jarbawi, Palestinian politician
Ali Kaya (serial killer) (born 1979), Turkish serial killer
Ali Kemal Bey, Turkish journalist, newspaper editor and poet
Ali Khademhosseini (born 1975), Iranian-Canadian bioengineer
Ali Khamenei (born 1939),  Supreme Leader of Iran since 1989
Ali Kordan (1958–2009), Iranian politician
Ali ibn Abbas al-Majusi, 11th century physician
Ali Maksum, Indonesian Islamic leader
Ali al-Masudi (al-Masʿūdī), Arab historian, geographer and traveler
Ali Mech, 13th-century tribal chief
Ali Akbar Moinfar, Iranian politician
Ali Moulana, Sri Lankan politician, chairman of Eravur Urban Council
Ali Qanso, Lebanese politician
Ali İsmet Öztürk (born 1964), Turkish aerobatics pilot
Ali ibn Ridwan, 11th century astrologer
Ali Sabancı, Turkish businessman
Ali Sadikin, Indonesian politician
Ali Said Raygal, Somali politician
Ali Sastroamidjojo, 8th and 10th Prime Minister of Indonesia
Ali Sayyar (1926–2019), Bahraini journalist and politician 
Ali Shayegan (1903–1981), Iranian politician
Ali Tayebnia (born 1960), Iranian academic and politician
Ali Wallace (naturalist), assistant to naturalist Alfred Russel Wallace
Ali Wazir, Pakistani politician and leader of the Pashtun Tahafuz Movement
Ali Yafie (1926–2023), Indonesian Islamic leader
Ali Yusuf Kenadid, Somali Sultan of the Sultanate of Hobyo
Ali I of Yejju (died 1788), Ethiopian leader
Ali II of Yejju (c. 1819 – c. 1866), Ethiopian leader

Given female name

Arts and entertainment
Ali Barter (born 1986), Australian singer-songwriter
Ali Bastian (born 1982), English actress
Ali Benjamin, American author
Ali Brown (born 1971), American author
Ali Brustofski (born 1993), American singer
Ali Bryan, Canadian novelist
Ali Caldwell (born 1988), American singer
Ali Cobrin (born 1989), American actress
Ali Cobby Eckermann (born 1963), Australian poet
Ali Ewoldt (born 1982), American theatre actress
Ali Fedotowsky (born 1984), American television presenter
Ali Gass, American curator
Ali Hillis (born 1978), American actress
Ali Kay, American model
Ali Landry (born 1973), American model and actress
Ali Larter (born 1976), American actress
Ali Lee (born 1982), Hong Kong actress
Ali Liebegott (born 1971), American writer
Ali Liebert (born 1981), Canadian actress
Ali Lohan (born 1993), American model and actress
Ali MacGraw (born 1939), American actress
Ali McGregor, Australian soprano
Ali Michael (born 1990), American fashion model
Ali Rogers (born 1991), American beauty pageant titleholder
Ali Ryerson (born 1952), American flutist
Ali Shaw (born 1982), Scottish television presenter
Ali Smith (born 1962), Scottish author
Ali Sotto (born 1961), Filipino actress
Ali Spagnola, American musician
Ali Sparkes (born 1966), British author
Ali Stephens (born 1991), American model
Ali Stone (born 1992), Spanish record producer
Ali Stroker (born 1987), American actress
Ali Tamposi (born 1989), American songwriter
Ali Wentworth (born 1965), American actress
Ali Wong (born 1982), Vietnamese-Chinese-American comedian

Sports
Ali Bernard (born 1986), American Olympic athlete
Ali Brigginshaw (born 1989), Australian international rugby league player
Ali Frantti (born 1996), American volleyball player
Ali Johnson (born 1998), English footballer
Ali Krieger (born 1984), American soccer player
Ali Loke (born 1993), Welsh squash player
Ali Riley (born 1987), American-born New Zealand soccer player
Ali Viola (born 1976), American softball player

Others
Ali Cupper (born 1980), Australian politician
Ali Hewson (born 1961), Irish activist
Ali Hogg (born 1980), Australian activist
Ali Holman (born 1973), American author
Ali Vincent (born 1975), American spokeswoman
Ali Watkins (born 1992), American journalist

Middle name
Abbas Ali Khalatbari (1912–1979), Iranian diplomat
Abdus Sobahan Ali Sarkar (born 1976), Bengali MLA of Assam
Ahmad Ali Sepehr (1889–1976), Iranian historian and politician
Ahmed Ali Enayetpuri (1898-1959), Bengali author and journalist
Ajmal Ali Choudhury (1916-1971), Bengali politician
Akbar Ali Khan, Bangladeshi economist 
Golam Ali Chowdhury (1824–1888), Bengali landlord and philanthropist
Hatem Ali Jamadar (1872–1982), Bengali politician
Janab Ali Majumdar, Bengali politician
Lotf Ali Khan (c. 1769–1794), last Shah of the Zand dynasty, of Persia
Mahbub Ali Khan (1934-1984), Bangladeshi chief of naval staff
Mehmet Ali Birand (1941–2013), Turkish journalist
Mohammad Ali Varasteh (1896–1989), Iranian statesman
Mohammed Ali Qamar, Bengali boxer
Morshed Ali Khan Panni, Bangladeshi politician
Najib Ali Choudhury, Bengali Islamic scholar
Osman Ali Sadagar (1856–1948), Bengali-Assamese politician and educationist
Rowshan Ali Chowdhury (1874–1933), Bengali journalist
Sherman Ali Ahmed, Bengali MLA of Assam
Wajid Ali Choudhury, Bengali MLA of Assam
Wajed Ali Khan Panni (1871–1936), Bengali aristocrat 
Wajid Ali Khan Panni II, Bangladeshi politician
Yakub Ali Chowdhury (1888–1940), Bengali essayist

Surname

Arts and entertainment
Aamir Ali, Indian television actor
Ahmad Ali (1910–1994), Pakistani writer
Ahmad Ismail Ali (1917–1974), Egyptian army officer
Alauddin Ali (1952–2020), Bangladeshi music composer
Ali (born 1968), Indian film actor
Begum Nawazish Ali (born 1979), Pakistani television host
Filiz Ali (born 1937), Turkish pianist
Imtiaz Ali (born 1971), Indian film director
Laylah Ali (born 1968), American visual artist
Mahershala Ali (born 1974), American actor
Shahalom Ali, better known as Ali Shahalom, comedian and television presenter
Rashied Ali (1935–2009), American drummer
Rucka Rucka Ali (born 1987), American rapper, radio personality, singer, comedian, and satirist
Sadeq Ali (1800–1862), Bengali poet, writer and judge
Somy Ali (born 1976), Bollywood actress
Syed Murtaza Ali, Bengali writer and historian
Tatyana Ali (born 1979), American actress and singer

Sports
Awais Ali (born 2005), Pakistani cricketer
Abdulaziz Ali (born 1980), Qatari footballer
Hameen Ali (born 1977), American football player
Imtiaz Ali (born 1954), former West Indian cricketer
Imtiaz Ali, Trinidadian cricketer
Jusif Ali (born 2000), Finnish footballer
Laila Ali (born 1977), American television personality and former professional boxer who competed from 1999 to 2007, daughter of Muhammad Ali
Meral Yıldız Ali (born 1987), Romanian-Turkish female table tennis player
Moeen Ali – English cricket player
Muhammad Ali (1942–2016; born Cassius Clay), American boxer, activist and philanthropist
Mohamed Ali (born 1992), Indian professional footballer 
Nur Ali (born 1974), Pakistani-American racing driver 
Rahman Ali (born 1944; born Rudolph Valentino Clay), American boxer, brother of Muhammad Ali
 Veronica Porché Ali, American psychologist and the former wife of boxer Muhammad Ali

Others
Abu Saeed Muhammad Omar Ali (1945–2012), Bangladeshi Islamic scholar and translator
Ahmadu Ali (born 1936), Nigerian politician
Anwar Ali, Pakistani economist
Ayaan Hirsi Ali (born 1969), writer and politician
Altab Ali, factory garment worker murdered by three teenagers in a racist attack in East London
Ayub Ali (1919–1995), Bangladeshi Islamic scholar and educationist
Ayub Ali Master (1880–1980), British-Bangladeshi social worker and entrepreneur
 Azad Ali, IT worker and civil servant for the HM Treasury
Azmin Ali (born 1964), Malaysian politician
Dina Ali, an Indian activist
Enam Ali, founder of the British Curry Awards, Spice Business Magazine and Ion TV
Hassan Al-Ali (Scouting), former General Secretary of the Kuwait Boy Scouts Association
 Ilias Ali (Bangladeshi politician), Bangladeshi politician, Organising Secretary of the Bangladesh National Party
Abul Aziz Muhammad Ismail Ali (1868–1937), Urdu poet and activist
 Jobeda Ali, social entrepreneur, documentary filmmaker and Chief Executive of Three Sisters Care
Kazim Ali (born 1971), American poet, novelist, essayist, and professor
 Mahbub Ali, Bangladeshi politician and Member of Parliament
 Mahmud Ali (statesman), Indian Freedom Movement leader, statesman
 Mockbul Ali, British diplomat and former Islamic Issues Adviser to the Foreign and Commonwealth Office
 Munsur Ali, British film producer, screenwriter and director
 Mustafa Ali, Malaysian politician 
 Muhammad Shamsi Ali (born 1967), Indonesian-American Muslim scholar
 Siraj Ali, British Bangladeshi restaurateur and philanthropist
 Nasim Ali, UK Labour Party politician, councillor and former Mayor of Camden
Noble Drew Ali (1886–1929), founder of the Moorish Science Temple of America
Ragib Ali, industrialist, pioneer tea-planter, educationalist, philanthropist and banker
Rushanara Ali (born 1975), British politician
Sabahattin Ali (1907–1948), Turkish novelist and journalist
Safiye Ali (1891–1952), Turkish physician
Saleem Ali (born 1973), Pakistani-American scholar
Salim Ali (1896–1987), Indian ornithologist and naturalist
Samina Ali, Indian-American author and activist
Sarfraz Ali (born c. 1977), convicted of the racially motivated murder of Ross Parker
Shah Muhammad Ibrahim Ali (1872–1931), Bengali poet and Islamic scholar
Shohid Ali, Bengali advocate
Sonni Ali (died 1492), first king of the West African Songhai empire
Syed Mohammad Ali (1928–1993), Bangladeshi journalist, founder of Bangladesh The Daily Star
 Syed Mohsin Ali, former Minister of Social Welfare
 Syed Mujtaba Ali, author, journalist, travel enthusiast, academician, scholar and linguist
 Sheikh Razzak Ali (1928–2015), author, journalist and politician in Bangladesh
Takis Mehmet Ali, German politician

Derived names

Male
Abdul Ali
Ali Reza
Ali Sher (disambiguation)
Barkat Ali
Mehmet Ali

Female
Aaliyah
Aliye
Aliya

Mononyms

Stage name or pseudonym
Ali (actor), Telugu comedian and TV presenter
Ali (French rapper) (born 1995), French rapper of Moroccan origin
Ali (graffiti artist)
Ali (American rapper), aka Ali Jones, American rapper
Ali (South Korean singer)
Ali (wrestler), ring name of Pakistani-American professional wrestler Adeel Alam
Ali B, Dutch rapper
Ali B (DJ), British DJ
Ali Bongo (magician) (1929–2009), stage name of British comedy magician William Wallace
Ali G, stage persona used by comedian Sacha Baron Cohen
 Ali Hassan (actor) (born 1972), Indian television actor
Ali Official, British-Bangladeshi comedian
Big Ali, American rapper and DJ

Fictional characters
Ali (character), a Chinese cartoon character
Ali (House), a character in the television series House
Ali Baba, a character in the folk tale of Ali Baba and the Forty Thieves
Ali Bombay, a character in the television series M.A.S.K.
Ali Osman, a character in the soap opera EastEnders
Ali Al-Saachez, a character in the anime series Mobile Suit Gundam 00
Ali, a character in The Land Before Time IV: Journey to the Mists

See also
Alli (disambiguation)
Allie
Alley (surname)
Prince Ali (disambiguation)
Turkish name

References

Arabic-language surnames
Arabic masculine given names
Bosniak masculine given names
Bosnian masculine given names
Finnish masculine given names
Iranian masculine given names
Pakistani masculine given names
Turkish-language surnames
Turkish masculine given names
Bengali Muslim surnames
Maldivian-language surnames